Conewago is an unincorporated community in West Donegal Township in Lancaster County, Pennsylvania, United States. Conewago is located at the intersection of Zeager Road and Bossler Road near Conewago Creek.

References

Unincorporated communities in Lancaster County, Pennsylvania
Unincorporated communities in Pennsylvania